Monte Carlo is a 2011 American adventure-romantic comedy film based on Headhunters by Jules Bass. It was directed by Thomas Bezucha. Denise Di Novi, Alison Greenspan, Nicole Kidman, and Arnon Milchan produced the film for Fox 2000 Pictures and Regency Enterprises. It began production in Harghita, Romania on May 5, 2010. Monte Carlo stars Selena Gomez, Leighton Meester and Katie Cassidy as three friends posing as wealthy socialites in Monte Carlo, Monaco. The film was released on July 1, 2011. It features the song "Who Says" by Selena Gomez & the Scene and numerous songs by British singer Mika. Monte Carlo received mixed reviews from critics, and earned over $39 million on a $20 million budget. Fox Home Entertainment released Monte Carlo on DVD and Blu-ray Disc on October 18, 2011.

Plot
Grace Bennett is a New York University-bound, Texas high-school student who works as a waitress in a restaurant with her high school dropout, best friend Emma Perkins to earn money for a post-graduation trip to Paris, France. Grace's stepfather pays for her uptight older stepsister Meg Kelly to join them, and Emma goes to Paris despite her boyfriend Owen's marriage proposal.

The trip quickly proves to be a disappointment; the girls discover they were ripped off, with a cramped hotel room and a tour that moves too fast for anyone to appreciate anything properly. After missing the bus and being left behind by their tour guide at the Eiffel Tower, the three girls seek refuge from the rain in a posh hotel. The hotel staff and paparazzi mistake Grace for the spoiled celebutante British heiress Cordelia Winthrop-Scott, Grace's double, who leaves rather than stay to attend an auction for a Romanian charity to which she is to donate a Bulgari necklace. Despite Meg's protests, the three girls spend the night in Cordelia's suite and fly to Monte Carlo with Cordelia's luggage the next day.

At the Hotel de Paris in Monte Carlo, the girls meet Theo Marchand, the son of the philanthropist hosting the charity. Theo is cold towards the three because he loathes Cordelia's spoiled nature. He escorts them to a ball, where Grace successfully fools Cordelia's aunt Alicia and Emma dances with Prince Domenico. Meg reunites with Riley, an Australian backpacker she briefly met in Paris. They find they have things in common and spend time together before he leaves for Italy. Meanwhile, Owen decides to travel to Paris in search of Emma.

When Grace participates in a polo game, Alicia discovers the impersonation because of Grace's different riding style. After calling the real Cordelia confirms her suspicion, Alicia believes Grace is a lookalike that Cordelia hired to take her place while she parties. However, after Alicia threatens her to expose the impersonation, Grace convinces her not to endanger the charity auction, and Alicia agrees to keep quiet.

Theo grows attracted to "Cordelia's" frank personality, while Domenico invites Emma to a party on a yacht. Emma dresses up for the party in the Bulgari necklace but meets Meg on the way, and Meg takes the necklace for safekeeping but later forgets about it, accidentally leaving it in Riley's backpack. At the party, Emma becomes disillusioned by Domenico's obnoxiousness, snideness, and arrogance toward the waitresses.

After seeing Emma in the newspaper account of Grace's appearance at the ball, Owen goes to Monte Carlo. Cordelia also arrives there and sees Grace in the newspaper. Finding the necklace is missing, she calls the police. The girls are in search for Riley after Meg tells Grace and Emma that he is leaving on a train to Italy, but later on he shows up at the hotel with the necklace to return to Meg. They find Cordelia in the suite, and when Cordelia threatens to withdraw the necklace from the auction, the girls panic and tackle her to the couch. When the police come to the door, they muffle her screams, and Grace covers for them. They tie Cordelia to a chair and gag her by stuffing an apple in her mouth, so Grace can take her place at the auction while Emma watches Cordelia. Owen arrives to the hotel in France and finds Emma at the suite, and they reconcile.

Cordelia eventually escapes and reveals Grace's fraud at the auction. She demands Grace's arrest, but after Grace's sincere public confession, Alicia bids the unexpectedly large amount of €6 million for the necklace to save her. When Cordelia still insists on the arrest, the inspector observes that there is legally no crime; Cordelia has no evidence that Grace did anything wrong now that the necklace has been returned, she can't prove when Grace was posing as her without compromising her own recent actions, and Cordelia can't force legal action just because she's upset about the situation. After the auction, the three girls leave and go on their separate ways. Meg decides to join Riley on his global travels around the world while Owen and Emma return to Texas, marry, and move into their own home. Theo and Grace reunite at the Romanian school, which the former runs and the latter volunteer-teaches.

Cast

 Selena Gomez as Grace Bennett/Cordelia Winthrop-Scott
 Leighton Meester as Meg Kelly
 Katie Cassidy as Emma Perkins
 Cory Monteith as Owen Andrews
 Pierre Boulanger as Theo Marchand
 Luke Bracey as Riley
 Catherine Tate as Alicia Winthrop-Scott
 Andie MacDowell as Pamela Bennett
 Brett Cullen as Robert Kelly
 Giulio Berruti as Prince Domenico Da Silvano
 Valérie Lemercier as Madame Valerie
 Franck de Lapersonne as Grand Belle's Manager
 Jeremiah Sullivan as Bartender 2
 Matt Devere as Steward on Jet

Production

Monte Carlo is loosely based on the novel Headhunters by Jules Bass. The novel tells the story of four New Jersey women who pretend to be wealthy heiresses while searching for rich potential husbands in Monte Carlo. There, they meet four gigolos posing as wealthy playboys. Fox bought the film rights to the novel in 1999, three years prior to the novel's publication. In 2005, Hollywood trade magazine Variety announced that siblings Jez and John-Henry Butterworth would be writing the script. It was also reported that actress Nicole Kidman had signed on to play the lead, as well as to produce the film with Rick Schwartz.

The Butterworths were later fired and Tom Bezucha was hired to direct and co-write Monte Carlo. Bezucha and Maria Maggenti turned in a draft of the screenplay by July 2007; it starred Kidman as "one of three Midwestern schoolteachers who decide to ditch a disappointing no-frills holiday in Paris and pose as wealthy women vacationing in Monaco". However, in 2010, executives had the film rewritten again after deciding that the film should have a more youthful spin. The updated script was co-written by Bezucha and April Blair, and changed the three school teachers to two college students and a recent high-school graduate. Monte Carlo was shot in Budapest, Hungary; Dunakeszi, Hungary; Paris, France; Harghita, Romania; and Monte Carlo, Monaco. It began filming in Harghita on May 5, 2010, and wrapped on July 7, 2010. It is the first film to use the film studio, Raleigh Studios Budapest.

In March 2010, it was announced that Selena Gomez had been cast as one of the film's leads following the script's rewrite. For the role, Gomez spent several weeks learning to play polo, and practicing how to fake an English accent. Leighton Meester also negotiated a deal to star as one of the leads that month, and Katie Cassidy was cast as Emma in April. French actor Pierre Boulanger made his English-speaking feature debut in the film.

Soundtrack
The film's musical score was composed by Michael Giacchino. To coincide with the film's release, a soundtrack album was released by Varèse Sarabande on June 28, 2011.

Reception

Critical response
Monte Carlo received mixed reviews from critics. Rotten Tomatoes gives the film a score of 40% based on 93 reviews. The website's consensus states "Although it has its charming moments, Monte Carlo is mostly silly, predictable stuff that never pushes beyond the boundaries of formula." At Metacritic the film received a score of 43 out of 100 based on reviews from 23 critics indicating "mixed or average reviews".

Logan Hill of Vulture wrote, "The film wallows in expensive clothes and locales but, like a puff-piece celebrity profile, wants you to have it both ways: to ogle the glamour and admire the righteous soul that’s purportedly beneath the surface but barely in evidence."

Ben Sachs of the Chicago Reader wrote that "the movie hits a surprising range of emotional grace notes, including several moments of genuine regret, and concludes with an understated moral lesson about the value of self-respect over social status." Sandie Chen of Common Sense Media said the film was "silly, but sweet".

Accolades

Home media
Fox Home Entertainment released Monte Carlo on DVD and Blu-ray Disc on October 18, 2011. The DVD extras include deleted scenes, a feature titled "Ding Dang Delicious: The Boys of Monte Carlo", a "Backstage Pass" and a theatrical trailer. The Blu-ray Disc features all the DVD features plus the addition of "Monte Carlo Couture", "Jet Setter's Dream", "Gossip with the Girls" and a digital copy of the film.

References

External links
 
 
 
 

2011 films
2010s adventure comedy films
2010s buddy comedy films
2010s coming-of-age comedy films
2011 romantic comedy films
20th Century Fox films
American adventure comedy films
American coming-of-age comedy films
American female buddy films
American romantic comedy films
American buddy comedy films
Dune Entertainment films
2010s English-language films
Films about lookalikes
Films about vacationing
Films directed by Thomas Bezucha
Films produced by Denise Di Novi
Films produced by Nicole Kidman
Films scored by Michael Giacchino
Films set in Monaco
Films set in Paris
Films set in Romania
Films set in Texas
Films shot in Budapest
Films shot in Dallas
Films shot in Monaco
Films shot in Paris
Films shot in Romania
Films with screenplays by Thomas Bezucha
Regency Enterprises films
2010s female buddy films
Films produced by Arnon Milchan
2010s American films